Labour Day Lake is a  lake located on Vancouver Island at the head of the Cameron River

References

Alberni Valley
Lakes of Vancouver Island
Lakes of British Columbia
Dunsmuir Land District